De La Noche: The True Story – A Poperetta is the fifth and final studio album by American actor, singer and songwriter Paul Jabara. 
The concept/musical album, released on Warner Bros. Records in the United States in 1986,  features guest vocals by Leata Galloway who also appeared on Jabara's previous album Paul Jabara & Friends (1983). The tracks "Ocho Rios" and "This Girl's Back in Town" were also issued as singles. 
De La Noche: The True Story - A Poperetta remains unreleased on CD.

Track listing

Side one
"De La Noche (Woman of the Night)" / "Ocho Rios"
"One From Your Heart"
"Deena's Dilemma" / "The Crime"

Side two
Entracte: "De La Noche (Woman of the Night) (Reprise)" / "The Search (Find Them!)"
"This Girl's Back in Town"
Finale: (Montage) "Mama's Fever"

Paul Jabara albums
1986 albums
Warner Records albums